Vlad Ioan Munteanu (born 16 January 1981) is a Romanian former professional footballer who played as a midfielder.

Club career
Munteanu came up through his hometown club FCM Bacău. He then moved to Dinamo București. He spent six years there appearing in over 90 matches. He also had brief loan spells at Poiana Câmpina and FC Naţional București. In 2006, he signed with Energie Cottbus of the German Bundesliga. In the summer of 2007 he was signed by VfL Wolfsburg, along with Sergiu Radu. Over the next three years, Munteanu was unable to establish himself at Wolfsburg and was loaned out to AJ Auxerre, Arminia Bielefeld, and FSV Frankfurt. In January 2011, he ended his contract with Wolfsburg and signed a deal for six months with his old club, Dinamo București.

International career
He has appeared in one international match in 2002 against Greece.

Personal life
His father, Ion was also a footballer who played for FCM Bacău and Universitatea Cluj and has over 250 Liga I appearances in which he scored 60 goals.

Honors

Club
Dinamo București
 Liga I: 2001–02, 2003–04
 Cupa României: 2000–01, 2002–03, 2003–04
 Supercupa României: 2005

References

External links
 
 
 
 
 

1981 births
Living people
Sportspeople from Bacău
Romanian footballers
Association football midfielders
Liga I players
FCM Bacău players
FC Dinamo București players
FCM Câmpina players
FC Progresul București players
Bundesliga players
2. Bundesliga players
FC Energie Cottbus players
VfL Wolfsburg players
VfL Wolfsburg II players
Arminia Bielefeld players
CS Concordia Chiajna players
FC Erzgebirge Aue players
Ligue 1 players
AJ Auxerre players
Romania international footballers
Romanian expatriate footballers
Expatriate footballers in Germany
Expatriate footballers in France
Romanian sports executives and administrators